Dąbrowice , German Dombrowitz is a village in the administrative district of Gmina Chrząstowice (Gemeinde Chronstau), within Opole County, Opole Voivodeship, in south-western Poland. Since 2006 it has been officially bilingual in German and Polish

History
The town of Dombrowitz was first mentioned in 1297. In 1526 the area came under the control of the Habsburg Empire. In 1566 the name was recorded as Dumbrowicz. After the War of the Austrian Succession, Silesia was taken by the Kingdom of Prussia. After the unification of Germany, the village was located in the Upper Silesia Province.

In the Upper Silesia plebiscite on March 20, 1921, 134 people voted to remain in Germany and 45 to join Poland. Consequently, Dombrowitz remained with Germany. In 1933 Dombrowitz had 233 inhabitants. Until 1945 it was located in the district of Landkreis Oppeln.

From 1935 the Nazi government made a large-scale effort to rename places with Slavic-origin names. On 15 June 1936 the town was renamed Eichgrund O.S. In 1939 the town had 294 inhabitants.

After 1945 the town was annexed to Poland and much of German population was expelled; it was renamed Dąbrowie to de-Germanize it, and later this name was changed to Dąbrowice. In 1950 the town was added to Opole Voivodeship and in 1999 Opole County (formerly Kreis Oppeln) was reconstituted. On 20 January 2006 the town was officially made bilingual in German and Polish, and in May its German name was made official alongside the Polish Dąbrowice.

References

Villages in Opole County